Platynaspis is a genus of beetle of the family Coccinellidae.

Species
 Platynaspis bella Wollaston, 1864 (Canaries)
 Platynaspis bisignata Mulsant (Madagascar)
 Platynaspis capicola  Crotch, 1874 (Africa, Indian Ocean islands)
 Platynaspis flavoguttata  (Gorham, 1894) 
 Platynaspis litura Weise, 1891
 Platynaspis luteorubra  (Goeze, 1777) 
 Platynaspis mesomelas Klug, 1833
 Platynaspis nepalensis  Canepari, 1997 
 Platynaspis nigra  (Weise, 1879)
 Platynaspis ocellimaculata  Pang & Mao, 1979 
 Platynaspis pilosa Sicard, 1930 
 Platynaspis saundersii Crotch 1874
 Platynaspis rufipennis  Gerstaecker, 1871
 Platynaspis solieri Mulsant  (from Africa)
 Platynaspis trimaculata  Weise, 1910
 Platynaspis usambarica Weise 1897
 Platynaspis villosa Fourcroy, 1785

References

 

Coccinellidae genera
Taxa named by Ludwig Redtenbacher